The WKF 80.04 was a prototype Austro-Hungarian reconnaissance aircraft built in the final months of World War I.

Development
80.04 was a biplane whose fuselage featured a hexagonal cross-section. Only one prototype was built.

Specifications

References

1910s Austro-Hungarian military reconnaissance aircraft
Biplanes
Single-engined tractor aircraft
Aircraft first flown in 1917